DGW or dgw may refer to:
Converse County Airport (IATA code: DGW), Wyoming, United States
Daungwurrung language (ISO 639-3 code: dgw), extinct language formerly spoken in Victoria, Australia
Dark Gravity Wave, mining difficulty adjustment algorithm used in the Dash cryptocurrency
Dgw (Dienstgüterwagen), one of the German railway wagon classes
Duoyuan Global Water (NYSE: DGW), Chinese water treatment equipment manufacturing company

See also
Association for Intercollegiate Athletics for Women, formerly the Division for Girls' and Women's Sports (DGWS)